Shadow Creek may refer to:
Shadow Creek Ranch, a master planned community in Pearland, Texas   
Shadow Creek Golf Course, an 18-hole golf course in North Las Vegas, Nevada